Lepypiranga is a monotypic moth genus in the family Erebidae and subfamily Arctiinae described by Rego Barros in 1966. Its only species, Lepypiranga albiceps, was described by Walter Rothschild in 1933. It is found in Brazil.

References

External links

Phaegopterina
Moths described in 1933
Monotypic moth genera